The cuneiform na sign is a common, multi-use sign, a syllabic for na, and an alphabetic sign used for n, or a; it is common in both the Epic of Gilgamesh over hundreds of years, and the 1350 BC Amarna letters. In the Epic of Gilgamesh it also has sumerogramic (capital letter (majuscule)) usage for NA. An example usage for NA in the Epic is for the spelling of NA.GAD, (also LÚ.NA.GAD, and the plural LÚ.NA.GAD.MEŠ), for Akkadian language "nāqidu", "herdsman". The usage for NA in herdsman is only for 3 spellings.

The commonness of cuneiform na, in the top 25 used signs by Buccellati (Buccellati 1979), (2nd highest usage, exceeded by a: a (cuneiform)) is because of usage for the spelling of a-na (Akkadian language "ana") -, the common preposition spelling for English language: to, for, by, of, at, etc.. It is also a component for the Akkadian language preposition: i-na (ina), meaning: in, into, by, etc..

The na sign usage from the Epic of Gilgamesh is as follows: na-(736 times), NA-(24).

Variety forms of cuneiform "na"

In the Amarna letters, EA 205, EA 364, etc., (see here , for a medium resolution, line 3 ARAD-ka a-na, EA 364) an alternate form of na, replaces the left side of the sign with: 2-horizontals , and a small  wedge above, with the vertical anchoring the right, -.

For Marduk-nadin-ahhe's kudurru at the British Museum, na is constructed approximately as follows: 1-horizontal lies at the sign's left , followed by a large wedge, then the vertical, resulting in a sign approximately as follows: .

References

Buccellati, Giorgio, (Ugarit-Forschungen 11, 1979). Comparative Graphemic Analysis of Old Babylonian and Western Akkadian, pp. 95–100.
Moran, William L. 1987, 1992. The Amarna Letters. Johns Hopkins University Press, 1987, 1992. 393 pages.(softcover)
 Parpola, 1971. The Standard Babylonian Epic of Gilgamesh, Parpola, Simo, Neo-Assyrian Text Corpus Project, c 1997, Tablet I thru Tablet XII, Index of Names, Sign List, and Glossary-(pp. 119–145), 165 pages.(softcover)-(Volume 1)
Ugarit Forschungen (Neukirchen-Vluyn). UF-11 (1979) honors Claude Schaeffer, with about 100 articles in 900 pages. pp 95, ff, "Comparative Graphemic Analysis of Old Babylonian and Western Akkadian", author Giorgio Buccellati, ( i.e. Ugarit and Amarna (letters), three others, Mari, OB, Royal letters, OB, non-Royal letters).

Cuneiform signs